This is a listing of all the singles and albums released by Motown singing group The Four Tops.

Throughout their career, 24 of their singles reached the Billboard Top 40 with seven of them reaching the top ten and two of them reaching #1 on the chart. An additional 21 have reached the UK Top 40 with ten reaching the top ten and one reaching #1 on the chart.

Much of the group's catalog is now controlled by Universal Music Group, as a result of various transactions involving many of the record labels for which the Four Tops recorded for over the years.

Albums

Studio albums

Compilation albums

Live albums

Singles

Early releases
1956: "If Only I Had Known" b/w "She Gave Me Love" (Grady Records, credited as "The Four Aims")
1956: "Kiss Me Baby" b/w "Could It Be You?" (Chess Records)
1960: "Ain't That Love" b/w "Lonely Summer" (Columbia Records, reissued in 1965) (US #93)
1962: "Where Are You" b/w "Pennies from Heaven" (Riverside Records)

Motown releases

 [A] "I'll Turn to Stone", as a B-side, peaked at #76 on the US Billboard Hot 100 chart and reached #50 on the US Billboard R&B singles charts.

ABC/Dunhill & ABC releases

Casablanca & RSO releases

 [B] "I Believe In You and Me" peaked at #40 on the US Billboard R&B singles charts.

More Motown releases

Arista releases

Videography/DVDs
Live at the MGM Grand: 40th Anniversary Special (1996)
The Four Tops [semi-documentary/concert rehearsal - recorded live for French TV, 1971] (2004)
From the Heart: The 50th Anniversary Concert (2006)
Reach Out: Definitive Performances 1965 - 1973 (2008)

References

External links 
 Four Tops biography by John Bush, discography and album reviews, credits & releases at AllMusic
 Four Tops discography, album releases & credits at Discogs
 Four Tops filmography on IMDb
 Four Tops Broadway musical productions at the Internet Broadway Database
 Four Tops discography at MusicBrainz
 Four Tops albums to be listened as stream on Spotify
 Vocal Group Hall of Fame page on the Four Tops
 Levi Stubbs/The Four Tops interview by Pete Lewis, 'Blues & Soul' October 1992 (republished November 2008)
 History of Rock article
 The Four Tops on Myspace
 Four Tops appearances on The Ed Sullivan Show
 Ronnie McNeir 2012 interview  at SoulInterviews.com

Discographies of American artists
Soul music discographies